Freeze is an unincorporated community in Latah County, in the U.S. state of Idaho.

History
A post office called Freese was established in 1899, and remained in operation until it closed in 1907. The community was named for the Freeze (or Freese) family of pioneer settlers.

References

Unincorporated communities in Latah County, Idaho
Unincorporated communities in Idaho